ε0, epsilon zero or epsilon nought may refer to:

In mathematics:
 ε0, the smallest member of the epsilon numbers (mathematics), a type of ordinal number

In physics:
 The vacuum permittivity ε0
 In the general case, relative static permittivity, represented as εr

See also 
 Epsilon